90P/Gehrels, also known as Gehrels 1, is a Jupiter-family comet in the Solar System.

References

Periodic comets
0090
Comets in 2017
19721011